Julie von Egloffstein (September 12, 1792 – January 16, 1869), countess, canoness of Hildesheim, was a German artist, encouraged in her work by Johann Wolfgang von Goethe.

Life
She was born in Erlangen, daughter of Gottfried Friedrich Leopold Graf von und zu Egloffstein and his wife Henriette.

She was one of the most beautiful and gifted women at the court of Weimar, and many of Goethe's poems bear witness to the lively interest which he took in her artistic development. She painted several portraits, including those of the Grand-Duchess of Saxe-Weimar and of Queen Theresa of Bavaria.

From 1829 to 1832 she toured Alsace, Switzerland and Italy, spending a considerable amount of time in Rome. She went to Italy again during 1838–1840, visiting Sorrento, Naples and Rome.

In addition to portraits, her  works included Shepherds in the Roman Campagna (1835), Hagar in the Wilderness, The Exposure of Moses, Italian Popular Life and others, some of which were in the possession of the Emperor of Russia and of Queen Victoria.

She died on January 16, 1869, at Marienrode.

See also
 List of German painters

References

Sources

 

1792 births
1869 deaths
19th-century German painters
German countesses
19th-century German women artists
German ladies-in-waiting